Joseph Grabarz is a former American politician, who served in the Connecticut House of Representatives from 1989 to 1993. He is most noted for being Connecticut's first state legislator ever to come out as gay.

Prior to his election to the legislature, Grabarz worked as an assistant in the office of Bridgeport mayor Thomas W. Bucci. He won the Democratic primary in 1988 over Mario Testa, Bucci's cousin, and won the election in November.

On December 17, 1990, Grabarz came out as gay at a press conference. He had already been out in his personal life for a number of years, but realized that even some of his colleagues in the legislature didn't know that he was gay after a Republican legislator questioned the need for a gay rights bill on the grounds that he had never met a gay person. Following his speech, while hugging and thanking well-wishers who had attended the event, he gave a kiss to his friend Greg Campora, and a photograph of that kiss accompanied most media coverage of his announcement. Although he received some negative reaction, his coming out was credited with helping to secure passage of a bill outlawing discrimination on the basis of sexual orientation in Connecticut.

Following the end of his term in office, he took a job as legislative director with the Human Rights Campaign. He was later named executive director of the Connecticut Civil Liberties Union in 1995.

References

1956 births
Democratic Party members of the Connecticut House of Representatives
Living people
20th-century American politicians
LGBT state legislators in Connecticut
Politicians from Bridgeport, Connecticut
Gay politicians
American LGBT rights activists